The Higher Education Recruitment Consortium (HERC) is a non-profit consortium of higher education institutions in the United States.

About HERC 

The first HERC was established in Northern California in 2000 with Stanford, Berkeley, and the University of California at Santa Cruz as lead members, with the goal of allowing colleges and universities to collaborate on the recruitment of faculty, staff, and executives. There are currently nineteen regional HERCs in the United States, consisting of over 550 campuses in 22 states and the District of Columbia.

The National HERC was established in 2007 to support the independent but affiliated regional HERCs. It is a program of the Tides Center, a 501(c)(3) nonprofit organization. The National HERC is governed by an Advisory Board composed of the National HERC Director, ex officio, regional HERC directors, a member representative, and a member representative alternate from each regional HERC.

HERC maintains a regional, web-based search engine with listings for faculty and staff job openings at all member institutions, including a dual-career couple search option.

List of regional HERC organizations
 Greater Washington State HERC
Metro New York and Southern Connecticut HERC
Michigan HERC 
Mid-Atlantic HERC
New England HERC
Northern California HERC
Southern California HERC  
Upper Midwest HERC 
Upstate New York HERC

References

External links 
 Higher Education Recruitment Consortium
 Regional HERCs and Member Institutions

Higher education in the United States
Recruitment
Non-profit organizations based in California
Academic administration
College and university associations and consortia in the United States
Organizations established in 2000